The following buildings were added to the National Register of Historic Places as part of the Early Residences of Rural Marion County Multiple Property Submission (or MPS).

References

 Marion
National Register of Historic Places Multiple Property Submissions in Florida